The second series of the British spy drama television series Spooks (known as MI-5 in the United States) began broadcasting on 2 June 2003 on BBC One, ending on 11 August 2003. It consists of ten episodes. Spooks centres on the actions of Section D, a counter-terrorism division of the British Security Service (MI5). Matthew Macfadyen, Keeley Hawes, David Oyelowo, Peter Firth, Hugh Simon, Shauna Macdonald, Rory MacGregor, Natasha Little, Nicola Walker, Megan Dodds, Jenny Agutter and Enzo Cilenti are listed as the main cast.

The second series was seen by an average of 7.19 million, and received generally favourable reviews from critics. The second episode attracted controversy for depicting a plot where a mosque is used to recruit suicide bombers; the controversy attracted near a thousand complaints and negative responses from key figures of Muslim groups across the United Kingdom. It was nominated for a British Academy Television Award (BAFTA) and a Royal Television Society Award, winning the latter. The second series was released on DVD on 20 September 2004 in Region 2, 11 January 2005 in Region 1, and 21 March 2005 in Region 4.

Cast
Main
 Matthew Macfadyen as Tom Quinn
 Keeley Hawes as Zoe Reynolds
 David Oyelowo as Danny Hunter
 Shauna Macdonald as Sam Buxton
 Hugh Simon as Malcolm Wynn-Jones
 Rory MacGregor as Colin Wells
with Nicola Walker as Ruth Evershed
and Peter Firth as Harry Pearce

Guests
 Megan Dodds as Christine Dale
 Natasha Little as Vicki Westbrook
 Enzo Cilenti as Carlo Franceschini
 Jenny Agutter as Tessa Phillips
 Esther Hall as Ellie Simm
 Lorcan Cranitch as Patrick McCann
 Heather Cave as Maisie Simm
 Tomas Arana as Herman Joyce
 Benedict Cumberbatch as Jim North
 Sophie Okonedo as Amanda Roke
 Ruth Gemmell as Miranda

Episodes

Broadcast and reception

Broadcast and ratings

The second series began broadcasting on 2 June 2003 on BBC One during the 9 to 10 pm timeslot, and continued on every Monday night until 11 August 2003, although there was a week break in the schedule midway through the series due to an overrun of a Wimbledon tennis match on 30 June. The second to ninth episodes were pre-empted to BBC Three a week before they are repeated on BBC One. In the US, the second series aired on A&E, though each episode had approximately fifteen minutes edited out to accommodate for advert breaks. The DVD release of the series in America contained the uncut episodes. It was later repeated on BBC America, alongside the first series from July 2007.

The second series began with overnight viewing figures of 7.8 million. The second episode lowered slightly to 7.6 million viewers, which was about a third of the television audience, while the third episode dropped to 6.9 million viewers, and the fourth rose slightly to 7.2 million, often winning its timeslot against repeats of ITV1's The Darling Buds of May. Overnight ratings rose to seven million for the second series finale. With consolidated figures factored in, the second series was seen by a per-episode average of 7.19 million viewers.

Critical reception
The second series received generally favourable reviews. Gord Lacey of TVShowsOnDVD called the second series "such a fun series", a "plausible spy show" and "a great show, [...] another solid BBC release." Dennis Landmann of MovieFreak stated that the season "rules" as it "tells complex, dangerous, and relevant stories that creates high octane, powerful drama", and the producers "create top notch work, from the excellent cinematography to the great-looking sets and locations, and from well researched and sweet scripts to solid acting by the principal actors." Landmann noticed the main focus towards Tom throughout the series that builds until he "becomes somewhat of a haunted soul" with the final minutes being "so powerful they affected how I felt for the next couple of days; I kept thinking about the character and the tragic events that happened to him". The reviewer summed up by stating "the second season improves on the first" and rated it nine out of ten.

Michael Mackenzie of The Digital Fix commented that "the chain events leading up to the chaotic final episode" was "extremely set up", even though he opined that Macfadyen had "always been the weakest actor in the ensemble". He also felt that there were instances where stories "go nowhere", including the Zoe and Carlo storyline. However, Mackenzie felt it was the strongest series out of the first three, saying it "remains some of the best television to be produced on this blighted isle in years" and rated it an eight out of ten. Adam Arseneau of DVD Verdict compared the series to 24 and The Wire. Arseneau stated that it clicks "on nearly every level required: great acting performances, fantastic story lines, well-written dialogue, gritty authenticity, and most importantly, unpredictability," summing the series as "sleek, stylish, tense, and compelling—some of the best television I have had the pleasure to watch".

Not all reviews were positive. Holly E Ordway of DVD Talk disliked the series, stating "I'd heard that it was a gripping, intelligent series that told great spy-thriller stories with gritty realism [...] Well, it seems [Spooks] and I are not meant to be together; I bounced off the show on the very first episode and never succeeded afterwards in bringing myself to like it any better." Ordway further felt it was "poorly acted", the rapid cuts and frantic editing "doesn't work" to make it more entertaining, and that the attempts for complexity were "painful".

Muslim controversy

The second series attracted controversy for its second episode, which depicted Islamic extremism at a mosque as a base of operations. The episode attracted around 800 complaints following its original BBC Three broadcast, with many appealing not to repeat it on BBC One. It was repeated, and attracted a further 150 complaints. The Broadcasting Standards Commission dismissed some of the complaints as the episode was presented as a drama and not a factual account. After the episode aired, a Muslim student in Birmingham was assaulted, and the Birmingham Central Mosque was vandalised, allegedly as a result of the show. The BBC denied that the episode had any influence on the incidents however, and the West Midlands Police ruled that there was no evidence linking the attacks to the programme.

The episode also received negative reactions from key members of many Muslim organisations across the country. Inayat Bunglawala of the Muslim Council of Britain stated "the programme, which was of a very sensational nature, unfortunately only serves to reinforce many negative stereotypes of British Muslims. Instead of being a well-informed piece of film-making, this episode of Spooks pandered to grossly offensive and Islamophobic caricatures of imams, Muslim students and mosques." Ahtsham Ali of the Islamic Society of Britain claimed that the episode "adds fuel to the fire of already negative perceptions of Muslims and fans the flames of British National Party rhetoric." Muslim Parliament of Great Britain's Dr Ghayasuddin Siddiqui said "It is sad the BBC is doing this, [...] We are trying to condemn this kind of involvement in our community...to keep on making us look responsible for these crimes is just manipulation."

The producers and the BBC responded to the controversy by citing Muslim involvement towards the research and making of the episode, including Muslim sources, and depicting the Muslim characters who stood against the terrorists. The producers stated that the episode was not meant to offend anybody, and that it did not imply that all Muslims are terrorists, only that "some fanatics" can give "millions of good people a bad name."

Accolades and viewer polls
The second series was nominated for two awards, winning one of them. Paul Knight and Barney Pilling were nominated for a British Academy Television (BAFTA) Craft award for Editing in Fiction/Entertainment, but lost out to Mark Day for his work on the 2003 serial State of Play. However it won a Royal Television Society award for Best Drama Series, beating At Home with the Braithwaites and Teachers.

The second series was well received by viewers. The BBC released a "Best of" viewer polls at the end of 2003 on its website. Spooks was voted the best drama for the year. However, it was also voted tenth in the "Worst Drama" category. The series was also voted first for "Best Drama Website". Macfadyen was awarded fourth in the "Best Actor" category, while Hawes was voted the second best actress, beaten only by Julie Walters for her roles in The Canterbury Tales, in which Hawes also starred, and The Return. Macfadyen and Hawes were also listed in the "Most Desirable Star" category, having voted seventh and third, respectively. Tessa Phillips was voted 13th for "Best Villain". The second series cliffhanger was the public's second favourite moment in television, beaten only by the surprise return of "Dirty Den" Watts from the soap opera EastEnders.

Home video release
The second series was first released on a DVD box set in the United Kingdom (Region 2) on 20 September 2004. It was later released in the United States (Region 1) on 11 January 2005, and in Australia (Region 4) on 21 March 2005. The box set consists of all 10 episodes of the second series over five discs in 16:9 widescreen format. The box set includes an array of special features. Five of the episodes contain audio commentary tracks, and all (with the exception of the second) include their own behind-the-scenes featurettes. In addition there are numerous other featurettes including many cast and crew members of the series, discussing various main characters and their cast members, resolving the cliffhanger from series one, and addressing the controversy the second episode attracted. An edited 50-minute showing of the first series finale that aired in the United States is also included. There were also deleted scenes, image galleries, trailers, series credits (Spooks is a programme that does not include credits in its episodes), and scripts of the episodes, the latter of which are found on DVD-ROM. In the United Kingdom, the box set was released with a "15" British Board of Film Classification (BBFC) certificate (meaning it is unsuitable for viewing by those under the age of 15 years).

Notes

References

External links
 

2003 British television seasons
Spooks (TV series)